Golden bamboo may refer to one of at least two species in the subfamily Bambusoideae of the grass family, Poaceae:
 Bambusa vulgaris
 Phyllostachys aurea